Proctocera scalaris is a species of beetle in the family Cerambycidae. It was described by Chevrolat in 1855. It is known from Sierra Leone, the Democratic Republic of the Congo, Cameroon, Nigeria, and the Republic of the Congo.

References

Lamiinae
Beetles described in 1855